A Quiet Normal Life: The Best Of Warren Zevon is a greatest hits album by American musician Warren Zevon released in 1986.

This compilation covers Zevon's four studio albums with Asylum Records.  It was mastered by Barry Diament.

Reception

Track listing
All songs written by Warren Zevon unless otherwise indicated.
 "Werewolves of London" (LeRoy Marinell, Waddy Wachtel, Zevon) (from Excitable Boy, 1978)  – 3:29
 "Excitable Boy" (Marinell, Zevon) (from Excitable Boy, 1978)  – 2:39
 "Play It All Night Long" (from Bad Luck Streak in Dancing School, 1980)  – 2:50
 "Roland the Headless Thompson Gunner" (David Lindell, Zevon) (from Excitable Boy, 1978)  – 3:47
 "The Envoy" (from The Envoy, 1982)  – 3:12
 "Mohammed's Radio" (from Warren Zevon, 1976)  – 3:41
 "Desperados Under the Eaves" (from Warren Zevon, 1976)  – 4:45
 "Johnny Strikes Up the Band" (from Excitable Boy, 1978)  – 2:48
 "I'll Sleep When I'm Dead" (from Warren Zevon, 1976)  – 2:56
 "Lawyers, Guns and Money (Radio edit)" (single, 1978)  – 2:56
 "Ain't That Pretty at All" (Marinell, Zevon) (from The Envoy, 1982)  – 3:34
 "Poor Poor Pitiful Me" (from Warren Zevon, 1976)  – 3:04
 "Accidentally Like a Martyr" (from Excitable Boy, 1978)  – 3:39
 "Looking for the Next Best Thing" (Kenny Edwards, Marinell, Zevon) (from The Envoy, 1982)  – 3:39

Certifications

References 

Quiet Normal Life: The Best of Warren Zevon, A
Albums produced by Greg Ladanyi
Albums produced by Waddy Wachtel
Quiet Normal Life: The Best of Warren Zevon, A
Elektra Records compilation albums